Eugene Arthur Okerlund (December 19, 1942 – January 2, 2019), better known by his ring name "Mean Gene" Okerlund, was an American professional wrestling interviewer, announcer and television host. He was best known for his work in the World Wrestling Federation (WWF, now WWE) and World Championship Wrestling. Okerlund was inducted into the WWE Hall of Fame in 2006 by Hulk Hogan. He was signed to a lifetime contract with WWE and later worked for promotional programs. He has been described by some journalists as the best interviewer in the history of professional wrestling.

Professional career

Early career
Eugene Arthur Okerlund was born on December 19, 1942 in Brookings, South Dakota to Arthur and Helen Okerlund. He grew up in Sisseton and was raised on an Indian reservation. He graduated from Sisseton High School in 1960. He was an all-around athlete, participating in basketball, baseball, football and track. After studying broadcast journalism at the University of Nebraska (Lincoln), Okerlund landed a job as a disc jockey at KOIL, a popular radio station in Omaha, Nebraska. Okerlund later moved to Minneapolis where he worked for WDGY as a radio host under the alias of Gene Leader. He later left that position to become Program Director at KDWB. Okerlund also worked in Minneapolis for a local television station in the front office.

Okerlund played with the Harold Johnson Orchestra and fronted the band Gene Carroll and the Shades. The band released "Is It Ever Gonna Happen" on the album In This Corner, on Norton Records in 1962.

American Wrestling Association (1970–1984)
Okerlund left the radio industry for a position at the American Wrestling Association (AWA) in 1970, where he occasionally filled in for ailing ring announcer and interviewer Marty O'Neill, eventually becoming O'Neill's permanent replacement by the end of the decade. While there, Jesse "The Body" Ventura gave him the moniker "Mean" Gene. According to Ventura, “In an interview, I laughingly called him ‘the Mean Gene Hot Air Machine,’ and the ‘Mean Gene’ stuck, I’m proud that I gave him a nickname that will stick with him forever.” His first interview was with Nick Bockwinkel and Bobby Heenan, acting terrified when both were jumped from behind.

World Wrestling Federation (1984–1993)
He stayed with the AWA until the end of 1983, when he was one of many AWA personnel to join the expanding World Wrestling Federation (WWF). 

He stayed with the WWF for nine years as their top interviewer and was a host of such WWF shows as All-American Wrestling. He sang the national anthem at the inaugural WrestleMania and Tutti Frutti on The Wrestling Album. Okerlund's interviews were memorable, most notably those involving Hulk Hogan, who began his interviews with “Well, you know, Mean Gene …”. He also notably teamed up with Hulk Hogan to face the duo of George Steele and Mr. Fuji in a winning effort. At SummerSlam 1989, Okerlund was booked to do an interview with Intercontinental Champion Rick Rude prior to Rude's match with The Ultimate Warrior. However, the planned backdrop for the interview inexplicably fell backwards, infamously causing mayhem backstage. At Survivor Series 1990, Okerlund was next to the giant egg where it hatched and out came the Gobbledy Gooker (played by Héctor Guerrero). As fans in attendance at the Hartford Civic Center started to boo, a rock and roll rendition of "Turkey in the Straw" began to play and Okerlund and Guerrero danced in the ring.

World Championship Wrestling (1993–2001)
Okerlund appeared at SummerSlam 1993 and made his final WWF appearance of the 1990s on the September 18, 1993 edition of Superstars. He then left the WWF entirely when his contract expired. He stated in an RF shoot interview, that although he probably could have re-negotiated a new contract, he was never actually offered one, thus opting to become an interviewer for World Championship Wrestling (WCW). He claimed at the time of his hiring with WCW that he had not been on speaking terms with McMahon for the past few years he was working in the WWF.

He debuted on the November 6, 1993 edition of WCW Saturday Night. He was mostly used in a mentor role. Three years later, his contract with WCW expired and he was off television for two months in the fall of 1996. His last appearance for a time was at WCW Fall Brawl on September 15, 1996. Okerlund had talks with the WWF during this time, however, they could not come to terms. Okerlund signed a new contract with WCW and returned on the November 11, 1996 edition of WCW Monday Nitro. Okerlund wrestled twice in WCW; the first was in mid-2000 when he and Buff Bagwell faced Chris Kanyon and fellow announcer Mark Madden, with Bagwell and Okerlund winning. However, Madden wanted Okerlund back in the ring the next week in a one on one match-up. The two did wrestle again and Okerlund won the match with the assistance of Pamela Paulshock. After that, he was with WCW until January 2001 when the company was purchased by the WWF.

Return to the WWF/WWE (2001–2018)

Shortly before WWF's purchase of WCW in 2001, Okerlund rejoined his old promotion (renamed WWE in 2002). His first assignment back with the WWF was the Gimmick Battle Royal during WrestleMania X-Seven on April 1, 2001, along with Bobby "The Brain" Heenan. He hosted WWE Confidential in 2002, which lasted for two years. Okerlund would also host WWE Madison Square Garden Classics, a weekly series, airing on the MSG Network, featuring classic WWE matches that took place at Madison Square Garden from the last four decades and the WWE Classics On Demand Hall of Fame section, which takes a look at a different WWE Hall of Famer each month.

Okerlund was inducted into the WWE Hall of Fame on April 1, 2006, by Hulk Hogan. In June 2008, Okerlund began hosting WWE Vintage Collection, a program which showcases archive footage from the extensive WWE video library.

Okerlund conducted the interviews on the three-hour "Old School" episode of Raw on November 15, 2010, where he interviewed John Cena, Randy Orton, members of The Nexus and Mae Young in similar fashion as to how interviews were done in the 1980s. In November 2016, Okerlund became the narrator for the WWE Network original animated series WWE Story Time, keeping that spot until his death with Jerry Lawler taking over the voiceover work for the show.

On January 22, 2018 at Raw 25 Years, Okerlund made his final WWE appearance where he interviewed the then WWE Champion, AJ Styles.

Other media
On November 12, 1985, Okerlund, along with Hulk Hogan, Bobby Heenan, Ricky Steamboat, Davey Boy Smith, Corporal Kirchner, Dynamite Kid and Big John Studd, appeared on The A-Team. That same year, Okerlund even interviewed Liberace (one of the highest paid entertainers at the time) at his penthouse at Trump Tower.

He appeared as himself, along with Jesse Ventura in the 1989 action movie No Holds Barred, as well as in the comedy films Repossessed in 1990, as the commentators for the exorcism and Ready to Rumble in 2000.

Okerlund lent his voice to the 2000 snowboarding game SSX as the announcer for the in-game level "Merqury City Meltdown".

Okerlund was one of the professional wrestling legends on the WWE Network's show Legends' House.

Okerlund appeared as a "Celebrity Prognosticator" on ESPN Radio's The Dan Le Batard Show with Stugotz on November 27, 2013.

In 2018, Okerlund appeared in a Mountain Dew Kickstart commercial featuring Kevin Hart who during the commercial semi-impersonated Randy Savage.

He made an appearance at the WrestleCade 2018 weekend event that took place November 23–25, 2018 in Winston-Salem, North Carolina.

Personal life
While in high school in Sisseton, South Dakota, he formed a band, "Gene Carroll & The Shades," recording a single in 1959, "Red Devil / Do You Remember" (M&L 1001). As "Gene Carroll," he had a second single in 1962, "Is It Ever Gonna Happen / Holly" (Wausau C-1100). The band played parties throughout the Midwest and the Dakotas, and in 2009 were inducted into the South Dakota Rock and Roll Music Association's Hall of Fame.

In his AWA days, Okerlund was given the nickname "Mean Gene" by Jesse "The Body" Ventura – an irony, considering that throughout the years many wrestlers and promotion staff considered Okerlund the friendliest person in the game. Okerlund was close friends with Hulk Hogan, The Iron Sheik and the late Bobby Heenan.

Okerlund had been married to his wife Jeanne since March 27, 1964 and had two sons, Todd and Tor, along with three grandsons. Todd starred on the University of Minnesota ice hockey team from 1983 to 1987, and played on the 1988 United States Olympics team that competed in Calgary, playing four games with the NHL's New York Islanders. 

In 2004, Okerlund had a kidney transplant. In his later years, Okerlund suffered from polycystic kidney disease. He also enjoyed boating, golfing, and spending time at his cabin in Big Sandy Lake during the summer.

Death
Okerlund died on the morning of January 2, 2019, at the age of 76 in a Sarasota, Florida hospital. It was revealed by his son, Todd Okerlund, that he had received three kidney transplants and had suffered a fall which caused his health to deteriorate in the weeks leading up to his death. Later that day, condolences were sent by some fellow WWE superstars and wrestling alumni on various social media sites, including: Ric Flair, Hulk Hogan, Iron Sheik, Stone Cold Steve Austin and Dwayne "The Rock" Johnson, among many others.

Awards and accomplishments
New England Pro Wrestling Hall of Fame
Class of 2005
Professional Wrestling Hall of Fame
Class of 2016
World Wrestling Federation/Entertainment
WWE Hall of Fame (Class of 2006)
Slammy Award (2 times)
Best Commentator (1986)
Best Head (1987) with Bam Bam Bigelow
Wrestling Observer Newsletter
Most Disgusting Promotional Tactic (1995) 900 hotline advertisements promo
Wrestling Observer Newsletter Hall of Fame (Class of 2016)

References

External links

Gene Okerlund(Aveleyman)...(older version)
 

1942 births
2019 deaths
Accidental deaths from falls
American color commentators
American people of Swedish descent
American television talk show hosts
Kidney transplant recipients
People from Robbinsdale, Minnesota
People from Sisseton, South Dakota
Professional wrestling announcers
Professional Wrestling Hall of Fame and Museum
West Virginia University alumni
WWE Hall of Fame inductees